Theloderma licin is a frog in the genus Theloderma from peninsular Malaysia and southern Thailand.  It is also known as The Smooth Frog. It inhabits lowland to montane forests. IT can be found in water filled tree holes, bamboo cuts, or man-made objects like metal pipes.

Range
Theloderma licin has been recorded from the following locations mostly in Malaysia, and also in Thailand.

Taman Negara Resort, Kuala Tahan, Taman Negara National Park, Pahang State
Lakum Forest Reserve, Pahang State
Bukit Rengit and Kuala Gandah, Pahang State
Pulau Perhentian, Pahang State
Ulu Muda Forest Reserve, Kedah State
Sungai Lasor base camp, Ulu Muda Forest Reserve, Kedah State
Ampang Forest Reserve and Raja Muda Forest Reserve, Selangor State
Kenaboi Forest Reserve, Negeri Sembilan State
Khao Lu-ang National Park, Nakhon Si Thamarat Province, Thailand

See also
Napal Licin

References

External links
Amphibian and Reptiles of Peninsular Malaysia - Theloderma licin

Theloderma
Amphibians described in 2007